The 2020–21 season was the 122nd season in the existence of TSG 1899 Hoffenheim and the club's 13th consecutive season in the top flight of German football. In addition to the domestic league, TSG 1899 Hoffenheim participated in this season's editions of the DFB-Pokal and in the UEFA Europa League. The season covered the period from 1 July 2020 to 30 June 2021. On 27 September 2020, on matchday 2 of Bundesliga season, Hoffenhiem ended Bayern Munich's 32 match winning run.

Players

First-team squad

Players out on loan

Transfers

Transfers in

Transfers out

Pre-season and friendlies

Competitions

Overview

Bundesliga

League table

Results summary

Results by round

Matches
The league fixtures were announced on 7 August 2020.

DFB-Pokal

UEFA Europa League

Group stage

The group stage draw was held on 2 October 2020.

Knockout phase

Round of 32
The draw for the round of 32 was held on 14 December 2020.

Statistics

Appearances and goals

|-
! colspan=14 style=background:#dcdcdc; text-align:center| Goalkeepers

|-
! colspan=14 style=background:#dcdcdc; text-align:center| Defenders

|-
! colspan=14 style=background:#dcdcdc; text-align:center| Midfielders

|-
! colspan=14 style=background:#dcdcdc; text-align:center| Forwards

|-
! colspan=14 style=background:#dcdcdc; text-align:center| Players transferred out during the season

|-

Goalscorers

Notes

References

External links

TSG 1899 Hoffenheim seasons
Hoffenheim
Hoffenheim